Iridomyrmex prismatis is a species of ant in the genus Iridomyrmex. Described by Shattuck in 1993, the species is endemic to Australia.

References

External links

Iridomyrmex
Hymenoptera of Australia
Insects described in 1993